Archana Gupta (also known as Archanna Guptaa, born 1 March 1990) is an Indian actress and model based out of Mumbai. She has acted in Tamil, Kannada, Malayalam, Telugu and a Russian film. She recently acted in a web series called Poison for Zee5 along with Arbaz Khan, Riya Sen, Freddy Daruwala, Tanuj Virwani & others.  Archana Gupta also played a lead role in short film Banjar alongside Maniesh Paul. She has also been participating in stage shows.

Personal life
Archanna was born in Agra and later moved to Mumbai to establish her career as a model and a film actress. She has one sister Vandana Gupta who is also an actress.

Career
Archanna made her acting debut in the Telugu film Andamaina Manasulo.

She made her Kannada debut in the film Circus, opposite Ganesh, which was released in mid-January 2009. She followed it up with three more films in Kannada: Lift Kodla, Karthik and Achchu Mechchu. She acted in a Russian film Raja Vaska.

In 2013, she is currently doing three projects in Malayalam — Rasputin, Hangover and Kaanchi.

Filmography

See also

 List of Indian film actresses

References

External links

 

Female models from Uttar Pradesh
Living people
Actresses from Mumbai
Actresses in Malayalam cinema
Actresses in Kannada cinema
Actresses in Telugu cinema
Actresses in Tamil cinema
21st-century Indian actresses
Indian film actresses
Actresses from Uttar Pradesh
People from Agra
1990 births
Actresses in Hindi cinema